State Route 48 (SR 48) is a long north–south state highway in Middle Tennessee.

Route description

Wayne, Perry, and Lewis Counties
SR 48 begins as a primary state route in far northern Wayne County at a junction with SR 13. Then it travels through the southeastern corner of Perry County before entering Lewis County to intersect SR 20, and then U.S. Route 412 (US 412) and SR 99 in Hohenwald. After Hohenwald, SR 48 then goes due north to Hickman County.

Hickman County

SR 48 then runs concurrently with SR 100 near the Beaver Dam Creek Wildlife Management Area. It follows SR 100 to Centerville, where it intersects SR 50 and bridges the Duck River.

SR 48 becomes a secondary route after separating from SR 100 and intersects SR 230 at Nunnelly. It then traverses Pinewood, and then intersects the exit 163 interchange with Interstate 40 (I-40)  not long after crossing into Dickson County.

Dickson County

It then enters the city of Dickson and intersects US 70 Business in downtown Dickson. SR 48 goes back to being a primary route and intersects with US 70/SR 1).

After exiting Dickson, SR 48 (as a primary highway) goes to intersect SR 49 in Charlotte, the Dickson County seat. SR 49 goes further north through Cumberland Furnace and then enters Montgomery County.

Montgomery County

It then enters Cunningham. When it reaches Cunningham, it runs concurrently with SR 13 from there to downtown Clarksville, where it intersects with SR 149 before crossing the Cumberland River to intersect US 41A Bypass/SR 12, and then US 41A/SR 12. After this point, SR 48 turns into a secondary state route for the remainder of its length. SR 48 runs concurrently with SR 13 again, but this time SR 13 is unsigned and US 79 is the main designation.

SR 48 splits from US 79 (Wilma Rudolph Boulevard) and then continues as Trenton Road. SR 48 (Trenton Road) then has an intersection with SR 374 (101st Airborne Parkway). SR 48 has two more intersections, one with SR 236, and then the exit 1 interchange on I-24 on the north side of Clarksville. Its northern terminus is at the Kentucky state line where the road enters Todd County, Kentucky and becomes Kentucky Route 104.

Major intersections

References

048
Transportation in Dickson County, Tennessee
Transportation in Lewis County, Tennessee
Transportation in Montgomery County, Tennessee
Transportation in Wayne County, Tennessee